Kenneth Webb (27 February 1921 – 7 March 1994) was an Australian cricketer. He played in two first-class matches for South Australia in 1946/47.

See also
 List of South Australian representative cricketers

References

External links
 

1921 births
1994 deaths
Australian cricketers
South Australia cricketers
Cricketers from Adelaide